The Polk Theatre in Lakeland, Florida  is a historic theater located at 121 South Florida Avenue.

The 1,400-seat theatre was built in 1928 after the local business "boom" of the town had ended and despite the fact that the population was only 15,000 inhabitants. In 1982, a group of concerned people banded together to save the theatre from being razed due to low attendance. Local citizens formed a non-profit group, borrowed money, secured a grant from the state, and purchased the theatre for $300,000. The theatre has a mezzanine, a high balcony, a permanent backdrop of a "Venetian piazza," an orchestra pit, a ceiling against which images of twinkling stars are projected, and terrazzo flooring. The air-conditioning system, which was the first in the county, was a pump that used artesian well water to chill the building.

Under the name Polk Theatre and Office Building, the building was added to the U.S. National Register of Historic Places in 1993.

Image gallery

See also

Movie palaces list

References

 Florida's Office of Cultural and Historical Programs
 Polk County listings
 Polk Theatre and Office Building
 Lakeland Historical Trail at Historic Hiking Trails
 History of the Polk Theater

External links

PolkTheatre.Org

Buildings and structures in Lakeland, Florida
Theatres on the National Register of Historic Places in Florida
National Register of Historic Places in Polk County, Florida
Renaissance Revival architecture in Florida
Theatres completed in 1927